Paul V. Franklin (born May 31, 1954) is an American multi-instrumentalist, known mainly for his work as a steel guitarist. He began his career in the 1970s as a member of Barbara Mandrell's road band; in addition he toured with Vince Gill, Mel Tillis, Jerry Reed and Dire Straits. He has since become a prolific session musician in Nashville, playing on more than 500 albums. He has been named by the Academy of Country Music as Best Steel Guitarist on several occasions. He was inducted into the Steel Guitar Hall of Fame in 2000 and the Musicians Hall of Fame and Museum in 2019. With thirty, Franklin is the most nominated person in CMA history and is notable for having been nominated for the Country Music Association Award for Musician of the Year twenty nine times but has yet to win.

In addition to the pedal steel guitar and lap steel guitar, Franklin plays Dobro, fiddle, and drums, as well as three custom-built instruments called the Pedabro, The Box, and the baritone steel guitar. Since 2016 Franklin has been offering online steel guitar lessons.

Musical innovations
He is noted for bringing multiple musical innovations to the country music scene. One of these, the Pedabro, is a type of Dobro fitted with pedals and played like a pedal steel guitar. This was invented by Franklin's father. The first of many hit records featuring the Pedabro was "Forever and Ever, Amen" by Randy Travis.

Franklin has also created two new variations of steel guitars, the first of which is a type of lap steel guitar nicknamed "The Box", whose sound has been described as a "swampy acoustic guitar". The other type of guitar that he invented is the baritone steel guitar, the strings of which are tuned an octave lower than a traditional pedal steel guitar.

Collaborations
He played steel guitar on the 1972 top-five hit "Nice to Be with You" by Gallery.

Franklin has worked with many well known acts during his career, including Mark Knopfler and Dire Straits, Barbara Mandrell, Rodney Crowell, Notting Hillbillies, Sting, Peter Frampton, George Strait, Alan Jackson, Faith Hill, Shania Twain, Barbra Streisand, Reba McEntire, Patty Loveless, Kathy Mattea, Big & Rich, Clint Black, Etta James, Jake Owen, Kane Brown, Kenny Rogers, Kid Rock, Lauren Alaina, Lee Ann Womack, Lionel Richie, Luke Bryan, Olivia Newton-John, Peter Cetera, Randy Travis, Ronnie Milsap, Sheryl Crow, Thomas Rhett, Tim McGraw, Toni Braxton, Trace Adkins, Vince Gill and Megadeth.

Franklin is a member of The Time Jumpers, a country and western swing band. In July 2013, he and Vince Gill released a collaborative album called Bakersfield.

Discography

Studio albums

References

External links
Paul Franklin Method
[ AllMusic Discography]
Paul Franklin Interview NAMM Oral History Library (2019)

1954 births
20th-century American guitarists
20th-century American male musicians
American country guitarists
American male guitarists
American session musicians
American multi-instrumentalists
Resonator guitarists
Pedal steel guitarists
Living people
Songwriters from Michigan
Singers from Detroit
Guitarists from Detroit
Country musicians from Michigan
The Notting Hillbillies members
American male songwriters
Lyle Lovett and His Large Band members